Beast is a mini-album by from Australian alternative rock band Magic Dirt. It was released in July 2007.

Reception
Reviews for Beast were mostly positive. The mini-album was greeted as their best work in years, a return to blistering form, as the band threw off any shackles.

JB HiFi's description of the EP is "Beast is a collection of 7 of the Dirt's most intense psycho-drama workouts. The lyrics take you to some dark places and force you to take a look around. This is their dirtiest primal grind yet."

Track listing
All songs written and arranged by Magic Dirt.

 "Horror Me" – 5:13
 "Bring Me the Head of..." – 3:23
 "Dirty One" – 2:45
 "Don't Panic" – 5:22
 "Hung" – 4:05
 "Lead Room" – 5:01
 "Sucker Love" – 5:38

Personnel
Adalita Srsen - Vocals, Guitar, Piano
Dean Turner - Bass, Vocals
Adam Robertson - Drums
Raúl Sánchez - Guitar, Vocals

Release history

References

 

2007 albums
Magic Dirt albums
Self-released albums